Lenin Avenue  is a main street of Yekaterinburg, Russia. It starts at Moskovskaya Street to the west, and ends at Kirov Square to the east. The street is one of the busiest in Yekaterinburg and is a major shopping area.

The street is named after Vladimir Lenin.

Among the buildings on the street is the Headquarters of the Volga-Urals Military District, at No.71.

See also
List of leading shopping streets and districts by city

Shopping districts and streets in Russia
Streets in Yekaterinburg